Neosabellaria is a genus of annelids belonging to the family Sabellariidae.

The species of this genus are found in America, Australia, Eastern Asia.

Species:

Neosabellaria antipoda 
Neosabellaria cementarium 
Neosabellaria clandestinus 
Neosabellaria kaiparaensis 
Neosabellaria rupicaproides 
Neosabellaria uschakovi

References

Annelids